Bellaspira margaritensis is a species of sea snail, a marine gastropod mollusk in the family Drilliidae.

Description
The size of an adult shell varies between 10 mm and 16 mm.

Distribution
This species occurs in the Caribbean Sea off Colombia and Venezuela.

References

External links
 
 McLean, James H., and Leroy H. Poorman. Reinstatement of the turrid genus Bellaspira Conrad, 1868 (Mollusca: Gastropoda) with a review of the known species. Los Angeles County Museum of Natural History, 1970

margaritensis
Gastropods described in 1970